Margaret Aitken (July 3, 1908 – November 19, 1980) was a Canadian author, columnist, journalist, and politician.

Background
Aitken was born in Newcastle, New Brunswick. She attended Branksome Hall in Toronto. She was the daughter of J. Mauns Aitken and her uncle was Max Aitken, 1st Baron Beaverbrook. Her brother, William Aitken and his son Jonathan Aitken (her nephew) were members of the British House of Commons.

She started with the Toronto Telegram in 1938 and was a foreign correspondent. She was noted for covering the birth of Israel as a nation and she became a strong supporter of the Jewish state. In 1953, she wrote a book Hey Ma! I Did It (Toronto: Clarke, Irwin & Company) about her political campaign in the same year.

Politics
In the 1953 federal election, she was elected to the House of Commons of Canada in the riding of York—Humber as the Progressive Conservative candidate, winning by 67 votes. Along with Sybil Bennett, Ellen Fairclough and Ann Shipley, she was one of four women elected to the House of Commons that year, only the second election in Canadian history in which more than one woman was elected to Parliament.

In 1957 she became the first woman to be appointed chair of a parliamentary committee, the Standing Committee on Standing Orders. The committee discusses rules of the House. She was re-elected in 1957 and 1958. She was defeated in 1962 by 662 votes.

Later life
In 1962, Aitken was appointed as Canada's representative to the UN's Commission on Human Rights. She died at age 72 after a long illness.

Electoral record

|-

|Progressive Conservative
|Margaret Aitken
|align="right"|11,157 

|Liberal
|Kenneth L. Thompson
|align="right"|11,090 

|Co-operative Commonwealth
|Jennie B. Prosser
|align="right"| 4,924   
|}

|-

|Progressive Conservative
|Margaret Aitken
|align="right"|  18,449

|Liberal
|Kenneth L. Thompson
|align="right"|10,851 

|Co-operative Commonwealth
| Margaret Thetford
|align="right"| 4,872 

|}

|-

|Progressive Conservative
|Margaret Aitken
|align="right"|23,723

|Liberal
|Elena Murdock Dacosta
|align="right"|9,557 

|Co-operative Commonwealth
|Leonard Collins
|align="right"|6,257    
|}

|-

|Liberal
|Ralph Cowan
|align="right"|15,526

|Progressive Conservative
|Margaret Aitken
|align="right"| 14,864 

|New Democratic Party
|Charles Millard
|align="right"| 11,622

|}

Publications

References

External links
 

1908 births
1980 deaths
Canadian newspaper journalists
Canadian women journalists
Women members of the House of Commons of Canada
Members of the House of Commons of Canada from Ontario
Progressive Conservative Party of Canada MPs
Women in Ontario politics
20th-century Canadian women writers
20th-century Canadian non-fiction writers
20th-century Canadian women politicians
Canadian women non-fiction writers